Sir John Rivett-Carnac, 2nd Baronet (10 August 1818 – 4 August 1883) was a member of the baronetage of the United Kingdom. He succeeded his father, Sir James Rivett-Carnac, 1st Baronet in 1846. He represented Lymington in the House of Commons as a Conservative from 1852 to 1860.

Personal background 
John Rivett-Carnac was born on 10 August 1818. He was the son of Sir James Rivett-Carnac, 1st Baronet, and Anna Maria Richardes. He married Anne Jane Sproule on 19 December 1840. Together, they had five children, including Maria Eliza Sproule Rivett-Carnac, Frances Henrietta Rivett-Carnac, Caroline Ann Emma Rivett-Carnac, Sir James Henry Sproule Rivett-Carnac, 3rd Baronet, and John Louis Rivett-Carnac.

Military service 
Rivett-Carnac served as a captain in the Army of the 73rd Regiment.

References

External links 
 

Baronets in the Baronetage of the United Kingdom
1818 births
1883 deaths
Conservative Party (UK) MPs for English constituencies
John
UK MPs 1852–1857
UK MPs 1857–1859
UK MPs 1859–1865